Ciolacu is a Romanian surname. Notable people with the surname include:

Andrei Ciolacu (born 1992), Romanian footballer
Ioana Ciolacu (born 1982), Romanian fashion designer
Marcel Ciolacu (born 1967), Romanian politician
Mihaela Ciolacu (born 1998), Romanian footballer
Mihai Ciolacu

See also
Ciolacu Nou, a commune in Fălești District, Moldova, and its village of Ciolacu Vechi

Romanian-language surnames